Qiao Xiaoguang (1918–2003) was a People's Republic of China politician and diplomat. He was the Chinese Ambassador to North Korea (1955–1961). He was born in Guangzong County, Hebei. He was twice Communist Party of China committee secretary of Guangxi (1966–1967, 1977–1985) and chairman of Guangxi (1977–1979). He was a delegate to the 4th and 5th National People's Congress and a member of the 11th Central Committee of the Communist Party of China and 12th Central Committee of the Communist Party of China.

1918 births
2003 deaths
People's Republic of China politicians from Hebei
Chinese Communist Party politicians from Hebei
Political office-holders in Guangxi
Ambassadors of China to North Korea
Members of the 12th Central Committee of the Chinese Communist Party
Members of the 11th Central Committee of the Chinese Communist Party
Members of the Central Advisory Commission
Delegates to the 4th National People's Congress
Qiao
Politicians from Xingtai